Goner may refer to:

 Goner, Rajasthan, a village in India
 Goner Records, an American independent record label
 "Goner", a song by Twenty One Pilots from the album Blurryface, 2015
 "Goner", a song by Trixie Mattel from the album the Blonde & Pink Albums, 2022
 Goners, an unrealized film project by Joss Whedon
 The Goner, a psychedelic folk rock band from Sweden

See also
 Gonner, a video game